Dragovič is a village in the Slovene Hills in the Municipality of Juršinci in northeastern Slovenia. The area is part of the traditional region of Styria. It is now included with the rest of the municipality in the Drava Statistical Region.

A chapel-shrine with a belfry, on a small hill in the hamlet of Aleluja, was built in the early 20th century.

References

External links
Dragovič on Geopedia

Populated places in the Municipality of Juršinci